Leonard "Len" Heard (born 18 January 1942) is a former English–American professional darts player who competed in British Darts Organisation events in the 1970s, 1980s and 1990s. He was nicknamed Lenny.

Darts career
Heard reached the final of the 1979 North American Open, losing to Eric Bristow.

Heard then played in the 1980 BDO World Darts Championship, losing in the first round to Dave Whitcombe.

Heard then won the 1980 North American Open. Then of the 1980 World Masters who losing to Kari Saukkonen of Finland. In the 1981 BDO World Darts Championship, Heard lost in the first round to fellow American Jerry Umberger.

Heard represented team USA of the WDF Pacific Cup with Tony Payne in 1986.

Heard then won the 1981 Las Vegas Open he beating Andy Green of United States. Then losing of the 1981 Houston Open Runner Up.

He then played in the 1982 Winmau World Masters but lost in the first round to Jocky Wilson.

Heard reached the quarter finals of the 1990 News of the World but lost to Steve Hudson

Heard then won the 1991 Camellia Classic beating by Paul Lim of Singapore.

Heard quit the BDO in 1991.

World Championship Results

BDO
 1980: Last 24: (lost to Dave Whitcombe 0–2)
 1981: Last 32: (lost to Jerry Umberger 0–2)

External links
Profile and stats on Darts Database

American darts players
Living people
British Darts Organisation players
1942 births
People from San Diego